Fishergate is an area in the centre of York, England.

Fishergate may also refer to:
Fishergate Shopping Centre in Preston, Lancashire, England
Preston Fishergate Hill railway station, formerly in Preston, Lancashire, England
 an earlier name of Joskeleigh, Queensland, Australia

See also
 Fishersgate railway station in Sussex, England